António Guterres, Secretary-General of the United Nations, described the gender pay gap as just a symptom of the gender power gap. He described that the gender imbalance between men and women exists “because gender equality is fundamentally a question of power.” “Centuries of discrimination and deep-rooted patriarchy have created a yawning gender power gap in our economies, our political systems, and our corporations.” He went on to describe how women are still excluded from the top table, from governments and prestigious award ceremonies to corporate boards.

According to a study conducted by gender data firm ExecuShe, women account for only a quarter of the total number of top executives at S&P 500 companies, while controlling just 1 percent of the value of shares held among fellow corporate leaders. “Male executives held roughly $770 billion worth of shares in S&P 500 companies in 2020, compared with an estimated $9 billion for female executives.” This means women have significantly less influence on a company's decision-making process as approximately 99 percent of the decision-making power is held by men.

Measuring the gender power gap 
In a webinar with UN Women’s Women’s Empowerment Principles, the gender power gap was described as a measurement of the proportional power held by women in executive decision-making positions. Its' calculation was presented as the value of shares held by female executives divided by the value of shares held by male & female executives. This measurement distinguishes itself from gender diversity, which they described merely measures “the presence of women at the top executive table by headcount” instead of the value of any specific number of top executive women who hold voting power, i.e. shares in their own companies.

Corporate C-Suite positions 
The webinar also stressed the importance and reality of certain executive positions possessing more power than others. For example, a typical chief executive officer (CEO) from a technology company holds, on average, 56% of decision-making power in the company, while the chief financial officer (CFO) holds 12%, the chief technology officer (CTO) and chief business officer (CBO) both hold 11%, and the chief human resources officer (CHRO) holds usually about 4%. If a woman holds any of these roles, more than likely, it would be CHRO with only 4%. Hence, why there is not only a need for more women in executive leadership positions, but for more women “to hold equivalent power as men so that these women have their voices heard”.

The power disparity between men and women in executive leadership positions was illustrated further when ExecuShe, partnered with The Female Lead, to release a list of the top female executive shareholders within the S&P 500, and their standing in comparison to their male counterparts. Their research revealed that 292 companies in the S&P 500 index had less than 10% of the share value in female hands. The list included such notable names as Jayshree Ullal, President and CEO of Arista Networks; Sheryl Sandberg, former COO of Facebook (now Meta Platforms); Lisa Su, President, CEO and Chair of Advanced Micro Devices; Ruth Porat, SVP and CFO of Alphabet; and Phebe Novakovic, chairwoman and CEO of General Dynamics Corp.

G20 countries 
ExecuShe's collaboration with UN Women also revealed that only 10.7% of power lies in the hands of women executives in the average G20 company, even though women represent themselves in 15.9% of executive positions on average. While countries like Australia (21.2%), South Africa (19.8%), and Canada (16.7%) all bode reasonably well in terms of the gender power gap, countries like Argentina (3.9%), Republic of Korea (2.1%), and Saudi Arabia (1.8%) though, still have long ways to go for corporate women in power.

References

Gender equality
Feminist economics
Misogyny
Sexism
Employment discrimination
Women-related neologisms
Industrial and organizational psychology